Sosnovka is a rural locality (a settlement) in Beryozovsky Selsoviet, Tyumentsevsky District, Altai Krai, Russia. The population was 330 as of 2013. There are 3 streets.

Geography 
Sosnovka is located 31 km southeast of Tyumentsevo (the district's administrative centre) by road. Beryozovka is the nearest rural locality.

References 

Rural localities in Tyumentsevsky District